The Motes are a Canadian indie rock band from Truro, Nova Scotia, and the founders of a record label called Ant Records. When recording, The Motes were J. LaPointe, and Jon Hutt. When performing live they were the recording duo plus Daniel MacDonald, and Craig Thibault.

History
The Motes began performing locally and releasing music on cassette in 1994. Their first release, on their own label, Ant Records, was Super Useless Powers.

The band performed in Halifax, Nova Scotia with the band State Champs, and in 1996 The Motes released a 45 rpm split single, "You'll Love the Epcot Plams/The New Physics", with them, through Ant Records. However, the Motes did not tour extensively to promote their releases.

By 1997 The Motes had disbanded; members of the band went on to form a number of other bands in and around Halifax, including North of America, Recyclone, and INSTRUMENTS.

In 2005 a collection of the band's previously recorded tracks was released on Dependent Records, along with five new tracks. In 2018 the band released a collection of alternate versions and outtakes titled Normandy Oddity. The cover art for Normandy Oddity was featured on the Music That Doesn't Suck blog.

Three of the original members The Motes performed live for the first time in 22 years as part of the Dartmouth Flood music festival in Dartmouth, Nova Scotia on Saturday, October 26, 2019.

Ant Records

Discography 
1994: The Motes - Super Useless Powers (cassette, Ant Records)
1994: The Motes - Secret Air Base (cassette, Ant Records)
1995: The Motes - Gesner (cassette, Ant Records)
1997: The Motes - Trellis I Tripod (cassette, Ant Records)
1997: The Motes - The New Physics (split 7-inch w/ State Champs, Ant Records / Daydream Records)
1998: The Motes - The Remains of False Starts (cassette, Ant Records)
1999: The Motes - Joe (CD, Ant Records)
2005: The Motes - The Remains of False Starts (CD re-release, Dependent Music)
2010: The Motes - History Missed (remastered digital re-release of all previous albums with bonus tracks)
2018: The Motes - Normandy Oddity (alternate versions and outtakes, 1994-1998)

References

External links
  TheMOTES on Bandcamp

Musical groups from Halifax, Nova Scotia
Canadian indie rock groups
Musical groups established in 1994
Musical groups disestablished in 1998
1994 establishments in Nova Scotia